Khandro Lhamo (1914 - 30 March 2003) was a doctor of Tibetan medicine, who was also a practitioner of Tibetan Buddhism who helped to build and maintain Shechen Monastery in Nepal.

Biography 

Lhamo was born in Kham in eastern Tibet to a modest family in 1914. She married Dilgo Khyentse Rinpoche when she was nineteen years old. The marriage was arranged quickly since Dilgo Khyentse had fallen ill after an austere retreat and his mentor, Dzongsar Khyentse Chökyi Lodrö, prophesied that a wife would heal him (despite the fact he did not want to marry, even though as a tertön he could die at young age if he did not); Lhamo did help him recover and was recognised as a ḍākinī. They travelled together whilst her husband undertook spiritual retreats; Lhamo also received Buddhist teachings with him in Tibet.

The late 1950s saw the People's Republic of China invade Tibet, one of the first places they reached was Kham, where Lhamo and Khyentse were living. In order for Khyentse to escape Chinese soldiers, Lhamo sent him a secret message warning him to flee to Lhasa. In 1959, accompanied by their two daughters and a small group of disciples, they fled Tibet to reach Bhutan.

Khandro Lhamo was a highly accomplished Doctor of Tibetan medicine, who contributed to the construction and maintenance of Shechen Monastery in Nepal.

After the death of Khyentse Rinpoche in 1991, she lived in the monastery Shechen Orgyen Chodzong in Bhutan and worked with Shechen Rabjam Rinpoche their son, to develop the institution for women.

Lhamo died on 30 March 2003 and was cremated in June 2003; relics of her eyes, tongue and heart were kept.

References

External links 
The Cremation of Khandro Lhamo

1914 births
2003 deaths
Tibetan women by occupation
Tibetan medicine
People from Kham